This is a list of albums recorded in tribute to the British heavy metal band Iron Maiden.

The Maiden Years Volume 1 – Tribute to Iron Maiden

Made in Tribute: A Tribute to the Best Band in a Whole Goddamn World! 

Made in Tribute: A Tribute to the Best Band in a Whole Goddamn World! is the first tribute compilation to Iron Maiden and features covers from established bands such as Arch Enemy, Therion and In Flames.

A Call to Irons 

A Call to Irons is one of the earlier tribute albums released to honour the heavy metal band Iron Maiden. It includes a diverse collection of bands ranging from power metal bands like Steel Prophet to extreme progressive metal bands like Opeth.

Transilvania 666 

Transilvania 666 is a tribute album to the heavy metal band Iron Maiden by various Spanish bands, released in 1999.

Disc 1:
 "Run to the Hills" (Avalanch)
 "Flight of Icarus" (Tierra Santa)
 "Charlotte the Harlot" (Lujuria)
 "The Evil That Men Do" (Azrael)
 "Wasted Years" (Skunk D.F)
 "Wrathchild" (Grass)
 "Fear of the Dark" (Demonios)
 "Revelations" (Twilight)

Disc 2:
 "Strange World" (Mägo de Oz)
 "The Trooper" (Easy Rider)
 "Phantom of the Opera" (Ankhara)
 "Powerslave" (Piramid)
 "Running Free" (Tea)
 "Holy Smoke" (Aerobitch)
 "Moonchild" (Sentinel)
 "Children of the Damned" (Dracon)

A Call to Irons Vol. 2 

For the second Call to Irons tribute album, Dwell used an all American line up with mainly progressive/heavy/power bands. A lot of the bands featured on this album are now defunct and had few if any original releases.

The Maiden Years Volume 2 – Tribute to Iron Maiden

Numbers from the Beast 

Numbers from the Beast is a tribute album to Iron Maiden that was released in 2005. It celebrated the band's 25th anniversary of the release of their debut album. The songs are performed by some of the leading names in heavy metal. The album is produced by Bob Kulick and Brett Chassen. The cover-art was made by Derek Riggs, creator of Maiden's mascot Eddie. Track three features former Iron Maiden lead vocalist Paul Di'Anno, who sang on the original version of the song. It used the "All-Star" Formation after the release of Roadrunner Records's "Roadrunner United", with the same premise.

Slave to the Power 

Slave to the Power is a tribute album to Iron Maiden.

Notes

Slave to the Power was also released as a single disc version in Japan (JVC/Victor, 2000) and South Korea (Sail Productions/Pony Canyon Korea, 2000) omitting various songs. 8 songs were licensed by Nuclear Blast for a bonus CD included with the European version of A Tribute to the Beast, Vol. 2 (2003).  A 2-CD/gatefold double vinyl version containing a total of 20 was released by Century Media subsidiary People Like You Records in 2003.  Russian label CD Maximum issued a 2-disc version in 2003 with all 26 songs that appeared on the original Meteor City release.

A Tribute to the Beast 

A Tribute to the Beast is a tribute album to the heavy metal band Iron Maiden that was released in 2002.

 "The Ides of March / Purgatory" (Steel Prophet)
 "Aces High" (Children of Bodom)
 "The Trooper" (Rage) (Onmyouza in Japanese version).
 "Hallowed Be Thy Name" (Cradle of Filth)
 "Running Free" (Grave Digger)
 "Prowler" (Burden of Grief)
 "Die With Your Boots On" (Sonata Arctica)
 "Children of the Damned" (Therion)
 "Transylvania" (Iced Earth)
 "Remember Tomorrow" (Opeth)
 "The Number of the Beast" (Sinergy)
 "Stranger in a Strange Land" (Disbelief)
 "Flight of Icarus" (Tierra Santa)
 "22 Acacia Avenue" (Dark Tranquillity)
 "Wrathchild" (Six Feet Under)
 "Powerslave" (Darkane)

A Tribute to the Beast, Vol. 2 

A Tribute to the Beast, Vol. 2 is a tribute album to the heavy metal band Iron Maiden that was released in 2003.

 "Killers" (Destruction)
 "The Trooper" (Sentenced)
 "2 Minutes to Midnight" (Primal Fear)
 "Wasted Years" (Thunderstone)
 "Wrathchild" (Stuck Mojo & Devin Townsend)
 "Remember Tomorrow" (Anthrax)
 "Iron Maiden" (Tankard)
 "Moonchild" (Necrophobic)
 "Strange World" (Mägo De Oz)
 "Déjà Vu" (Wolf)
 "Sanctuary" (Mystic Prophecy)
 "Fear of the Dark" (Graveworm)
 "Revelations" (live) (Therion)
 "Hallowed Be Thy Name" (Iced Earth)
 "Children of the Damned" (Sebastian Bach)
 "Run to the Hills" (John West & Chris Caffery)
 "Murders in the Rue Morgue" (Cosmosquad & Ray Alder)
 "Flight of Icarus" (Ian Perry & Kamelot)
 "Another Life" (Solace)
 "Alexander The Great" (Eleventh Hour)
 "Purgatory" (Wardog)
 "Running Free" (Iron Savior)

Food for Thought 

Food for Thought is an Iron Maiden tribute album with a slightly different take on the band's music. It was released in July 2005 after having been worked on for two years by Swedes Henrik Johansson and Mattias Reinholdsson. It features mainly Johansson and Reinholdsson doing different genre versions of Iron Maiden songs with contributions from musician friends and acquaintances. The intention with the tribute was to make it sound like the covers were done by a bunch of very different bands which might explain the album's left field take on some of the songs.

"Be Quick or Be Dead"
"Twilight Zone"
"22 Acacia Avenue" (feat. Gabriela Kulka)
"The Angel and the Gambler"
"The Mercenary"
"The Trooper" (feat. LG Petrov of Entombed)
"Fortunes of War"
"Blood on the World's Hands"
"Stranger in a Strange Land"
"Flash of the Blade"
"Wildest Dreams"
"Futureal"
"The Nomad"
"Sanctuary" (feat. Björn Flodkvist, Enter the Hunt, ex. Candlemass)
"Innocent Exile"
"Public Enema Number One"
"Heaven Can Wait"
"Burning Ambition" (feat. Bo Lindberg of Hoven Droven)
"Seventh Son of a Seventh Son"

The Piano Tribute to Iron Maiden 

The Piano Tribute to Iron Maiden is a tribute album to the heavy metal band Iron Maiden that was released on 2 August 2005, from Vitamin Records, a label located in Los Angeles California. It is described as "a symphony that sounds perfect on every track when played on piano"

Recorded in early 2005 by the pianist and conductor Scott Lavender.

 "2 Minutes to Midnight" – 6:33
 "Wasted Years" – 5:11
 "Can I Play with Madness" – 3:46
 "The Trooper" – 4:54
 "Brave New World" – 5:04
 "Run to the Hills" – 3:49
 "Caught Somewhere in Time" – 5:55
 "Aces High" – 4:46
 "Hallowed Be Thy Name" – 6:55
 "Flight of Icarus" – 3:55
 "Number of the Beast" – 6:02
 "Eddie's Lament" (Original track) – 4:49

Maiden Heaven 

Maiden Heaven: A Tribute to Iron Maiden is a tribute album to the heavy metal band Iron Maiden that was released on 16 July 2008, as a free gift with Kerrang! Issue 1219. It is described as "our tribute to Iron Maiden, which features exclusive covers by Metallica, Avenged Sevenfold, Coheed & Cambria, Trivium, Machine Head and Dream Theater" on the Kerrang! website.

Between 14 and 26 May, Kerrang! ran a competition to determine the CD's cover. The entrants were told to interpret the concept in any way they wanted, and using any tools they could. The winner would receive a year's subscription to Kerrang! and their art would feature on the cover.

On 18 June, Felipe Franco from Bogotá, Colombia was announced as the winner, and his entry (Eddie as an angel who has burst into flame, in a landscape of ash) was displayed on the Kerrang! website.

 "Prowler" (Black Tide) – 3:53
 "Remember Tomorrow" (Metallica) – 5:46
 "Flash of the Blade" (Avenged Sevenfold) – 4:00
 "2 Minutes to Midnight" (Glamour of the Kill) – 5:38
 "The Trooper" (Coheed and Cambria) – 4:22
 "Wasted Years" (DevilDriver) – 5:00
 "Run to the Hills" (Sign) – 5:07
 "To Tame a Land" (Dream Theater) – 7:16
 "Caught Somewhere in Time" (Madina Lake) – 4:02
 "Wrathchild" (Gallows) – 2:40
 "Fear of the Dark" (Fightstar) – 7:13
 "Hallowed Be Thy Name" (Machine Head) – 7:26
 "Iron Maiden" (Trivium) – 3:42
 "Running Free" (Year Long Disaster) – 3:14
 "Brave New World" (Ghostlines) – 4:35

Volume 2
A new edition of Maiden Heaven titled Maiden Heaven Volume 2: An All-Star Tribute to Iron Maiden was released in June 2016, accompanying issue 1623 of the magazine.

 "Running Free" (Stone Sour)
 "Speed of Light" (Reigning Days)
 "Hallowed Be Thy Name" (Escape the Fate)
 "Fear of The Dark" (Lonely the Brave)
 "For The Greater Good of God" (Trivium)
 "The Red and The Black" (Steven Battelle)
 "The Evil That Men Do" (Creeper)
 "The Number of The Beast" (Lower Than Atlantis)
 "Powerslave" (Anaal Nathrakh)
 "Aces High" (Cry Venom)
 "Sun and Steel" (Fozzy)
 "The Wicker Man" (Muncie Girls)
 "The Trooper" (Heck)
 "Remember Tomorrow" (Uncle Acid & the Deadbeats)
 "Wasted Years" (Anathema)

The Golden Beast 

The Golden Beast is a tribute album to Iron Maiden by various Colombian bands, released in 2008. The album was recorded by Julio Monroy at DeltaRecords studios in Bogota, Colombia. Juan Arbelaez from Evenpro was the commercial producer.

"Wasted Years" (Sigma)
"Infinite Dreams" (Entropia)
"The Evil That Men Do" (Legend Maker)
"The Wicker Man" (Perpetual)
"Aces High" (Noiszart)
"Be Quick or Be Dead" (Introspeccion)   
"Can I Play With Madness" (Terra Sur)
"Flight of Icarus" (Akash)

See also
 Tribute album
 The Iron Maidens
 Maiden uniteD

References

Iron Maiden